The A.S. Noon Building is a historic building in Nogales, Arizona. It was built in 1915 for A. S. Noon, and designed in the Chicago School architectural style. One of the stores was owned by Wing Wong, a Chinese merchant. The building has been listed on the National Register of Historic Places since August 29, 1985.

References

 
National Register of Historic Places in Santa Cruz County, Arizona
Chicago school architecture in the United States
Commercial buildings completed in 1908
1908 establishments in Arizona Territory